Alphin is a surname. Notable people with the surname include:

Arthur Alphin (born 1948), United States Army officer and military historian
Elaine M. Alphin (1955–2014), American writer
Gerald Alphin (born 1964), American football player
Nick Alphin, American sound engineer